Nový Svet is a village and municipality in western Slovakia in  Senec District in the Bratislava Region.

History
In historical records the village was first mentioned in 1871.

Geography
The municipality covers an area of 7.747 km². It has a population of 59 people.

External links/Sources
 
https://web.archive.org/web/20070513023228/http://www.statistics.sk/mosmis/eng/run.html

References

Villages and municipalities in Senec District